Queen City Landing was an approved residential tower proposal by developer Gerald Buchheit on the Outer Harbor of Buffalo, New York. Preparation work included the demolition of a 6-story warehouse formerly operated by Freezer Queen Foods and the project was planned to have approximately 200 apartment units. Upon completion, it would have been the 6th tallest building in Buffalo and the 13th tallest in Upstate New York, with a height of 324 feet and 23 floors.

The tower was targeted in a lawsuit by local environmentalists out of concern that it posed a danger to bird migration, given its immediate proximity to the Tifft Nature Preserve, and also that the city board did not conduct a full environmental study on the site. However, on multiple occasions, a state Supreme Court judge upheld the city board's decision to build the tower and also ruled that the city acted properly in its environmental study. Bucheit completed the environmental cleanup of the site in late 2018.

On November 18, 2019, Bucheit announced a slight change in the tower's design. The building would be reduced to 20 stories and would be moved farther away from the water, in addition to occupying 30 percent less land. The new finish date was tentatively projected to 2021. In addition, Bucheit also added plans for a surrounding neighborhood around the main tower complete with two 6-story apartment buildings, a cluster of 3-story townhouses, and more public space. However, in light of the COVID-19 pandemic, continued resistance from the plaintiffs, and an inability to secure public funding from the city, the project was "suspended indefinitely" in March 2020 and presumably cancelled for good the following year when the developer listed the property for sale.

See also
 List of tallest buildings in Buffalo

References

External links
 Official website
 Apartments at Queen City Landing - Trautman Associates
 Emporis page

Proposed buildings and structures in New York (state)
Skyscrapers in Buffalo, New York